The Northern Athletics Collegiate Conference men's basketball tournament is the annual conference basketball championship tournament for the NCAA Division III Northern Athletics Collegiate Conference. The tournament has been held annually since the NACC's foundation in 2007. It is a single-elimination tournament and seeding is based on regular season records.

The winner, declared conference champion, receives the NACC's automatic bid to the NCAA Men's Division III Basketball Championship.

Results

Championship records

 Concordia Chicago have not yet qualified for the NACC tournament finals.
 Maranatha Baptist never qualified for the tournament finals as NACC members

References

NCAA Division III men's basketball conference tournaments

Recurring sporting events established in 2007